"Snowden" is the second single from British indie rock band Doves' third album, Some Cities (2005). It was released in the United Kingdom on 9 May 2005, charting at number 17 on the UK Singles Chart and number 42 on the Irish Singles Chart. The single version of the song was mixed by Rich Costey. Two music videos were produced for the song, directed by Dominic Leung. One features the album version of the song, and the other (also known as the "live edit") features the Rich Costey mix, with both videos featuring different footage.

B-side "Son of a Builder" contains elements of "Beasley Street," written by Mancunian performance poet John Cooper Clarke.

Track listings

Charts

References

2005 singles
2004 songs
Doves (band) songs
Heavenly Recordings singles
Songs written by Andy Williams (Doves)
Songs written by Jez Williams
Songs written by Jimi Goodwin
Song recordings produced by Ben Hillier
Space rock songs